David Mundo Apatang (born July 10, 1948) is a Northern Mariana Islander politician who is serving as the 13th lieutenant governor of the Northern Mariana Islands since 2023. He previously served as the mayor of Saipan from January 12, 2015 to January 8, 2023. As a Republican, Apatang formerly served in the Northern Mariana Islands House of Representatives. Apatang was elected lieutenant governor of the Northern Mariana Islands in the 2022 election on an independent ticket headed by Arnold Palacios.

Education 
While in the Army, Apatang earned a Bachelor of Arts degree in speech and communications from San Francisco State University.

Career

Military service 
Apatang served in the United States Army from 1967 to 1987. A Vietnam War veteran, Apatang was stationed at various times in Vietnam; the Panama Canal Zone; Würzburg, Germany; Fort Lewis in Washington; Fort Benjamin Harrison in Indiana; and Fort Jackson in South Carolina. He ended his career at Fort Jackson and served on its courts-martial council. He retired with the rank of fiirst sergeant in 1987.

Following his military service, Apatang served in local government. He served seven consecutive terms in the Northern Mariana Islands House of Representatives.

Commonwealth Legislature 
Atapang was elected to the Northern Mariana Islands House of Representatives in the 1995 general election. He was the second highest vote-getter in Saipan's Precinct 1. Apatang ran for the Senate in 2001 on behalf of the Covenant Party in the Northern Mariana Islands Senate's 3rd district. In the 2005 gubernatorial election, Apatang ran for Lieutenant Governor as the running mate of Heinz Hofschneider. While both Hofschneider and Apatang were Republicans, they ran as independents. In a four-way race, the HofschneiderApatang ticket lost to Benigno Fitial and Timothy Villagomez of the Covenant Party by a single point.

Mayor of Saipan 
Shortly after the death of Donald Flores, the mayor of Saipan, Apatang announced his candidacy for the position. Apatang, running as an independent, defeated Republican candidate Jose Alguto Reyes and Democratic candidate Antonio Pinaula Mareham in the 2014 general election. Apatang succeeded Marian Tudela, the acting Mayor appointed after Flores's death. He is currently serving his second term which ends January 2023. His wife, Antonia Pangelinan Mafnas, died in Hawaii on December 14, 2016. He was sworn in on January 12, 2015.  In 2021, the House passed a resolution to honor Apatang's 50 years of service to the people of the CNMI.

2022 lieutenant gubernatorial election 
Apatang ran as a candidate for Lieutenant Governor of the Northern Mariana Islands in the 2022 election, running on an independent ticket headed by then incumbent lieutenant governor Arnold Palacios.

References

|-

 

 

1948 births
Lieutenant Governors of the Northern Mariana Islands
Living people
Mayors of Saipan
Republican Party (Northern Mariana Islands) politicians